A wing is an appendage used for flight by an animal or an apparatus used to create lift in aeronautics or a way to increase width (leverage) on a sailboat.

Wing may also refer to:

Places

England
Wing, Buckinghamshire, England
 Wing, Rutland, England

United States
 Wing, Alabama, United States
 Wing, North Dakota, United States

People with the name
 Wing (singer) (born 1960), the stage name of Wing Han Tsang, a New Zealand singer from Hong Kong
 Anna Wing (1914–2013), English actress
 Brad Wing (born 1991), American-football player from Australia
 Craig Wing (born 1979), rugby league player for the Sydney Roosters
 Donald Wing (1904–1972), Yale Librarian, compiler of a notable short title catalogue of books
 Helen Wing ( (1892 – 1981) American author, composer, and pianist
 Jeannette Wing, computer science researcher and corporate vice president of Microsoft Research
 Jerry L. Wing (1923–1994), American businessman and politician
 Joseph Wing (born 1810), and William Ricketson Wing (1830–1908), owners of whaling company J. & W. R. Wing Company
 Lorna Wing (1928–2014), Asperger syndrome researcher
 Toby Wing (1915–2001), American actress
 Warner Wing (1805–1876), American jurist and legislator
 Wings Hauser (1805–1876),  American actor and occasional director

Arts, entertainment, and media

Fictional characters
 Wing (DC Comics), a DC Comics character
 Wing (Hunter × Hunter), a character from the manga series Hunter × Hunter
 Wing (Transformers), a character from the Transformers universe
 Colleen Wing, a samurai in the Marvel Comics universe

Gaming
 Wing Commander (franchise), a media franchise comprising space combat simulation video games from Origin Systems, Inc.
Wing Commander (video game), the eponymous first game in Chris Roberts' science fiction space flight simulation franchise

Other uses in arts, entertainment, and media
 Wings (1990 TV series), American sitcom television series that ran for eight seasons on NBC
 Wing (poetry collection), by Matthew Francis
 "Wing" (South Park), an episode of South Park featuring the singer Wing
 Wing (waltz), a ballroom dance move
 WING, an AM radio station in Dayton, Ohio
 Wing Chun, a concept-based traditional Southern Chinese Kung fu (wushu) style and a form of self-defense, also known as "beautiful springtime" 
 Wing Records, a record label
 "Wing", a song by Patti Smith from Gone Again, 1996

Brands and enterprises
 Wing (company), a subsidiary of Alphabet
 T-Mobile Wing, a Pocket PC phone
 The Wing (workspace), a women-focused co-working space in the United States

Computing 
 WinG, a Windows interface in computing
 Wing IDE, an integrated development environment for Python

Transportation
 Wing, another term for fender, the panel which surrounds the wheel on a motor vehicle
 Wing, a type of spoiler, an aerodynamic device intended to generate downforce on a motor vehicle
 Wing configuration, is an aircraft design for fixed-wing aircraft, pertaining to its arrangement of lifting and related surfaces

Other uses
 Wing (basketball), a combination shooting guard and small forward
 Wing (building), part of a building subordinate to the main
 Wing (military unit), a unit of command, usually comprising two or more squadrons;  the associated rank is Wing commander (rank)
 Wing, part of the backplate and wing device worn by scuba divers
 Wing, one of several botanical terms
 Wing, a slang term for a human arm

See also 
 Left wing
 Right wing
 Take Wing
 Wing and a Prayer (disambiguation)
 Winger (sports), a position in several sports
 Wings (disambiguation)